Lou Vernon (26 June 1888, Brisbane – 22 December 1971, Sydney) was an Australian actor of stage, radio and screen and producer. He started his career in musical comedy, and was particularly noted for his versatility and ability as a character actor. He had a son Ross Vernon, who was in the RAAF, after abandoning a  radio career.

Filmography

References

External links
 at IMDb

Male actors from Brisbane
20th-century Australian male actors
1888 births
1971 deaths
Australian male stage actors
Australian male radio actors